Velodromo Vigorelli (from 2001 officially Velodromo Maspes-Vigorelli) is a  semi-covered velodrome in Milan, Italy.  It is currently used mostly
for  American football events, in fact, surrounded by the track, there is a standard size football field in synthetic turf. In 2013 it was the home of the IFAF European Football Championship. It is currently the home stadium for the football teams Seamen Milano and Rhinos Milano.

The stadium holds 9,000 people and was built in 1935 by Vigorelli Cycles. It was burned down during the second world war after bombing of Milan by the RAF but then rebuilt.

The stadium was home to the hour record from 1935 to 1967 and the one-hour tandem record of Ernest Mills and Bill Paul from 1937 to 2000. It hosted the UCI Track Cycling World Championships in 1939, 1951, 1955 and 1962. After years of neglect and planned demolitions, campaigning by local enthusiasts led to the approval by local authorities in March 2014 of plans to renovate the velodrome.

The stadium has also hosted music events, including the Beatles' concert on June 24, 1965. It was the site of a concert by English rock band Led Zeppelin which took place during the band's 1971 European tour, well known for its descent into a violent riot between concert attendees and the local police.

Hour record

Men's hour record
The hour record for bicycles is the record for the longest distance cycled in one hour. From 1935–1967 it was set exclusively at the Velodromo Vigorelli by nine different cyclists in 10 rides.

He established the track's reputation as fastest in the world. From 1936 Maurice Richard; Frans Slaats; Maurice Archambaud; François Faure; Fausto Coppi; Jacques Anquetil; Ercole Baldini and Roger Rivière added a further  to the record, until the Olympic track in Rome became faster.

Tandem one-hour record
The trip had been funded by readers of Cycling. This record stood until on September 23, 2000 at Manchester velodrome it was beaten by Simon Keeton and Jon Rickard of Rutland Cycling Club.

Women's hour record
The record stood for 14 years.

See also 
 Harry Hill (cyclist)

References 

Vigorelli
Velodromes in Italy
Sports venues in Milan
Cycle racing in Italy
Rugby union stadiums in Italy
Sports venues completed in 1935
1935 establishments in Italy
American football venues in Italy
European League of Football venues